Guillermo Encina (born 7 November 1951) is a Chilean professional golfer.

Encina was born in Santiago, Chile. He was taught the game by his father, the head greenskeeper at the Papudo Club in Chile, and turned professional in 1975. He won several tournaments in his home country, including the Chile Open five times, and spent time on the South African and Canadian tours and the pre-Asian Tour Asian circuit. He represented Chile at the World Cup four times.

After turning 50, Encina joined the European Seniors Tour. He made the top thirty on the Order of Merit each season from 2002 through 2006, with a highest ranking of sixth in 2003. He won his first European Seniors Tour event in 2006.

Professional wins (6)

Other wins (5)
1988 Chile Open
1990 Chile Open
1991 Chile Open
1999 Chile Open
2001 Chile Open

European Senior Tour wins (1)

European Senior Tour playoff record (0–1)

Team appearances
World Cup (representing Chile): 1993, 1996, 1998, 1999

External links

Chilean male golfers
Sunshine Tour golfers
European Senior Tour golfers
Sportspeople from Santiago
1951 births
Living people
20th-century Chilean people